Seema G. Nair (born 21 May 1968) is an Indian actress who appears in Malayalam films and Malayalam TV series. She has won the Kerala state television award for best actress in 2014 for the telefilm Moksham.

Biography
Both Nair and her mother Cherthala Sumathi won the Kerala State Amateur Drama Award.

Career

Seema started her career as a theater artist, at the age of 17, appearing in Cochin Sangamithra's drama Kanyakumariyil Oru Kadamkadha in 1987. She has performed drama on more than 1000 stages. Later she moved to serials and then to movies. Mostly she played roles of middle or lower-class family women. Her first serial was Cherappayi Kadhakal, in which she played the role "Kocheroda". She is a member of Make-A-Wish Foundation, for Kerala division, a charity Organization based in India. She has acted in some telefilms. She has participated in a reality show named Nakshathradeepangal on Kairali TV. She has judged a popular reality show named Rasikaraja No.1 on Surya TV. She has attended popular talk shows like Valentines Corner, Valkkkanadi, Nammal Thammil, and the Sreekandan Nair Show.

The Kerala Art Lovers Association 'Kala' has awarded the first Mother Teresa Award to Seema G Nair for being a role model in the field of social welfare. The award carries a cash prize of Rs 50,000 and a citation.Kerala Governor Arif Mohammad Khan presented the award to Seema G Nair at a function in Raj Bhavan.

Awards
2021 - Mother Teresa Award
2019 - Asianet Television Award for Best Character actress: Vanambadi
2018 - Minnale Awards -Best Actress
2018 - Tharangini television awards - Best Supporting actress: Vanambadi
2014 - Kerala state television award for best actress: Moksham
 1992 Kerala State Amateur Drama Awards

Partial filmography

Television serials (Partial) 

 Pakida Pakida Pambaram ("Padicha Kallan") 
 Cherappayi Kadhakal (Doordarshan) 
 Kalanum Kandakashani (Doordarshan) 
 Manasi (Dooradarshan) 
 Snehaseema (Dooradarshan)
 Maruubhoomiyile Pookkalam (Dooradarshan)
 Manjurukum Kalam (Dooradarshan)
 Gokulam (Asianet)
 Thalamurakal (Surya TV)
 Mizhi Thurakkumbol (Surya TV)
 Thali (Surya TV)
 Mohapakshikal (Surya TV)
 Sthree (Asianet)
 Kalipattam
 Kolangal (Sun TV)- Tamil Serial
 Minnukettu  (Surya TV)
 Sthree Oru Sandhwanam (Asianet) 
 Ente Alphonsamma (Asianet)
 Velankani Mathavu (Surya TV)
 Priyamanasi (Surya TV)
 Summer in America (Kairali TV)
 Mangalyappattu (Kairali TV)
 Vazhiyariyathe (Doordarshan)
 Indraneelam (Surya TV)
 Manjalprasadam (Green TV)
 Sooryakanthi (Jaihind)
 Akashadoothu (TV series) (Surya TV)
 Veera Marthanda Varma (Surya TV)
 Manasaveena (Mazhavil Manorama)
 Ulkkadal (Kairali TV)
 Mukesh Kathakal (Kairali TV)
 Balamani (Mazhavil Manorama)
 Sthreethvam (Surya TV)
 Ponnambili (Mazhavil Manorama)
 Manasa Maina (Kairali TV)
 Vishudha Chavara Achan (Flowers)
 Sooryakanthi (Jaihind) - Relaunched
 Vanambadi (TV series) (Asianet)
 Mouna Ragam (TV series) (Vijay TV)- Tamil Serial
 Jagratha (Amrita TV)
 Guru (Jaihind)
 Mizhinirppoov (ACV)
 Uyire (TV series) (Colors Tamil) - Tamil Serial
 Ente Bharya (Flowers TV)
 Sundari (Surya TV)
Mouna Raagam 2(Vijay TV)- Tamil Serial

Plays

 Aayudha Pandhayam
 Oru Kadam Katha
 Ascharyachoodamani 
 Chanthamullaval
 Kanyakumariyile Oru Kadamkatha
 Chayamukhi
 Charithrapusthakam

TV Shows

 Nakshathradeepangal - Contestant
 Rasikaraja Number one -Judge
 Ponnona Pachakam - Presenter
  Kalladuppum Karichattiyum - Presenter
 Red Carpet - Mentor
 Selfie
 Don't Do Don't Do  - Participant
 Nammal Thammmil  - Participant
 Smart Show - Participant
 Sarigama - Participant
 Parapsaram - Participant
 Sreekandan Nair Show - Participant
 Onnum Onnum Moonu - Participant
 Flowers Oru Kodi - Participant

References

External links

Seema G Nair at MSI
https://web.archive.org/web/20140304033848/http://www.metromatinee.com/artist/Seema%20G%20Nair-900

Actresses in Malayalam cinema
Indian film actresses
Actresses from Kerala
Living people
Indian television actresses
People from Kottayam district
Actresses in Malayalam television
Actresses in Tamil television
Actresses in Malayalam theatre
Indian stage actresses
20th-century Indian actresses
21st-century Indian actresses
Kerala State Television Award winners
1965 births
Indian voice actresses
Actresses in Tamil cinema